Bon Air Manor or Benson's Park is a historic plantation home located in Ellicott City, Howard County, Maryland.

The Bon Air Manor is a historic gatehouse to the original Benson's Park Manor. Benson's Manor was a 250-acre parcel patented by Daniel Benson in 1696. The property was later expanded to 268 acres. The gatehouse was part of a complex of outbuildings including a barn, stone jail, and slave quarters built in 1805. The property adjacent to the New Cut Landfill has been subdivided for residential development and reduced in size.

See also
Lilburn (Ellicott City, Maryland)

References

Houses completed in 1870
Howard County, Maryland landmarks
Houses in Howard County, Maryland
Buildings and structures in Ellicott City, Maryland
Slave cabins and quarters in the United States